The 1969–70 Divizia A was the fifty-second season of Divizia A, the top-level football league of Romania.

Teams

League table

Results

Top goalscorers

Champion squad

See also 

 1969–70 Divizia B
 1969–70 Divizia C
 1969–70 County Championship

References

Liga I seasons
Romania
1969–70 in Romanian football